András Törőcsik (1 May 1955 – 9 July 2022) was a Hungarian footballer of the 1970s and 1980s. From 1977 to 1984 he made 45 appearances and scored 12 goals for the Hungary national team.

Club career
He started his career at Budapesti VSC and played the majority of his career for local giants Újpest Dozsa. He also had spells abroad with Montpellier and North York Rockets and MTK Budapest as well as a season with Hungarian second tier-side Volán FC.

International career
He made his debut for Hungary in an October 1976 friendly match away against Austria and earned a total of 45 caps scoring 12 goals. He appeared at the 1978 FIFA World Cup (where he was sent off against hosts Argentina) and the 1982 FIFA World Cup. At the latter tournament, Törőcsik was substituted in the world record 10-1 win over El Salvador by László Kiss, who went on to become the first ever player to score a hattrick as a sub during a World Cup.

His final international was an August 1984 friendly against Mexico.

Death
He died of pneumonia in the Honvéd hospital in Budapest in July 2022.

Honours

Club
Újpest Dozsa
 Hungarian League: 1974–75, 1977–78, 1978–79
 Hungarian Cup: 1974–75, 1981-82, 1982-83

References

External links
 

1955 births
2022 deaths 
Deaths from pneumonia in Hungary
Footballers from Budapest
Association football forwards
Hungarian footballers
Hungary international footballers
1978 FIFA World Cup players
1982 FIFA World Cup players
Újpest FC players
Montpellier HSC players
Volán FC players
North York Rockets players
MTK Budapest FC players
Nemzeti Bajnokság I players
Ligue 2 players
Nemzeti Bajnokság II players
Canadian Soccer League (1987–1992) players
Hungarian expatriate footballers
Expatriate footballers in France
Hungarian expatriate sportspeople in France
Expatriate soccer players in Canada
Hungarian expatriate sportspeople in Canada